Sir Edward Coey Bigger (1861 – 1 June 1942) was an Irish politician and physician. He was an independent member of Seanad Éireann from 1925 to 1936. He was first elected to the Seanad at the 1925 election for 9 years. He was re-elected at the 1934 election for 3 years.

He was chairman of the Irish Public Health Council, the Central Midwives Board for Ireland, and of the General Nursing Council for Ireland, and was the author of a report to the Carnegie United Kingdom Trust on the physical welfare of mothers and children in Ireland. He was the Crown Representative for Ireland on the British General Medical Council from 1917 to 1927.

His son Joseph Warwick Bigger was a senator from 1947 to 1951.

References

External links

1861 births
1942 deaths
Irish knights
Independent members of Seanad Éireann
Members of the 1925 Seanad
Members of the 1928 Seanad
Members of the 1931 Seanad
Members of the 1934 Seanad
Irish public health doctors
Irish healthcare managers